Philotheca queenslandica is a species of flowering plant in the family Rutaceae and is endemic to south-eastern Queensland. It is a wiry shrub with elliptic to egg-shaped leaves with the narrower end toward the base and densely crowded near the ends of the glandular-warty branchlets, and cream-coloured flowers tinged with pink and arranged singly in leaf axils.

Description
The ten stamens are hairy with longer hairs near the tip.

Taxonomy and naming
This philotheca was first formally described in 1942 by Cyril Tenison White who gave it the name Eriostemon queenslandicus and published the description in the Proceedings of the Royal Society of Queensland. In 2005 Paul Irwin Forster changed the name to Philotheca queenslandica in the journal Austrobaileya.

Distribution and habitat
Philotheca queenslandica grows in wallum heathland in moist or seasonally flooded, boggy or sandy soil. It is found in south-eastern Queensland between Boonooroo and Bribie Island.

Conservation status
Philotheca queenslandica is classified as of "least concern" under the Queensland Government Nature Conservation Act 1992.

References

queenslandica
Flora of Queensland
Sapindales of Australia
Plants described in 1942
Taxa named by Cyril Tenison White